Hotel Arctic may refer to:
Hotel Arctic (Greenland)
Hotel Arctic (Murmansk)